Ntokozo Siboniso Mamba (born 24 February 1991) is a Liswati football player who plays for the Eswatini national team. He debuted on 4 September 2019 in the 2022 FIFA World Cup qualification, and scored his first goal for Eswatini against Djibouti in a 2-1 defeat.

International goals
Scores and result list Eswatini's goal tally first.

References

1991 births
Living people
Eswatini international footballers
Swazi footballers
Association football defenders